Richard David James (born 18 August 1971), best known as Aphex Twin, is an Irish-born British musician, composer and DJ. He is known for his idiosyncratic work in electronic styles such as techno, ambient, and jungle. Journalists from publications including Mixmag, The New York Times, NME, Fact, Clash and The Guardian have called James one of the most influential and important artists in contemporary electronic music.

Raised in Cornwall,  James began DJing at free parties and clubs in the area in the late 1980s. His debut EP Analogue Bubblebath, released in 1991 on Mighty Force Records, brought James an early following; he began to perform across the UK and continental Europe. James co-founded the independent label Rephlex Records the same year. His 1992 debut album Selected Ambient Works 85–92, released by Belgian label Apollo, garnered wider critical and popular acclaim. James signed to Warp in 1993 and subsequently released charting albums such as ...I Care Because You Do (1995) and Richard D. James Album (1996), as well as Top 40 singles such as "Come to Daddy" (1997) and "Windowlicker" (1999); the latter two were accompanied by music videos directed by Chris Cunningham and brought James significantly wider international attention.

After releasing Drukqs in 2001 and completing his contract with Warp, James spent several years releasing music on his own Rephlex label, including the 2005 Analord EP series under his AFX alias and a pair of 2007 releases as the Tuss. In 2014, he made available a previously unreleased 1994 LP as Caustic Window. He returned later that year with the Aphex Twin album Syro on Warp, winning the Grammy Award for Best Dance/Electronic Album. He has since released charting EPs including Cheetah (2016) and Collapse (2018).

Early life

James was born on 18 August 1971 in Limerick, Ireland, to Welsh parents. He has said that he had a stillborn older brother also named Richard whose name he inherited. In a 1997 interview with Alternative Press, James stated that this death occurred while his family had moved to Canada in 1968 for mining work; it led his mother to reuse the name because "she didn't want to accept the death of the child." James grew up in Cornwall, where he lived in Lanner while attending Redruth School in Redruth. James said he liked growing up there, "cut off from the city and the rest of the world".  He became interested in making sounds before writing music, and as a child he played with the strings inside his family piano and disassembled tape equipment. In a 2001 interview, James said that at age 11, he won £50 in a competition for producing sound on a Sinclair ZX81, a home computer with no sound hardware: "I played around with machine code and found some codes that retuned the TV signal so that it made this really weird noise when you turned the volume up." However, Fact Magazine reported in 2017 that this contest story is dubious, and likely based on a program published in Your Computer Magazine 1982, for which the author (G. N. Owen) was paid £6. James states that he bought his first synthesizer at age 12 and after taking an interest in electronics would modify analogue synthesisers "and junk" to make noise.

James began making music aged 14, partially as a refuge from the "bloody awful" Jesus and Mary Chain albums played by his sister. Cornwall had few record shops, but a thriving nightlife in which acid house was popular. James claimed to have been making music with similarities to acid and techno for years before hearing the genres, leading him to purchase every record he could find in the styles. In his late teens, James began DJing at clubs and raves, and included his own tracks in his sets. He studied at Cornwall College from 1988 to 1990 and graduated with a National Diploma in engineering. According to one lecturer, he often wore headphones during practical lessons and had a "kind of mystique about him ... I think some of the other students were a bit in awe of him."

Career

1988–1991: Cornish free parties, Rephlex Records and first releases
In the late 1980s, James became involved in the Cornish free party scene, putting on raves at "secret coves along the coast and behind sand dunes". The first party he DJed at was in a barn in 1988. Parties were also known to take place at Gwennap Pit. They mainly attracted local youths and travellers, with entrance donations taken in cannabis. The tight-knit community would also put on nights at small clubs in towns around the county, including St. Ives, Porthtowan, and St Austell. James would later refer to this scene as the "best he's ever been involved in".

James started a regular DJ slot in 1989, playing alternate weeks at the Bowgie nightclub in Crantock. There he met Tom Middleton and Grant Wilson-Claridge. Impressed by James' music, Middleton played a tape James had given him to a free party organiser in Exeter, who eventually convinced James to release a record on his fledgling record label Mighty Force Records. James was initially resistant, but while he was tripping on acid backstage at a DJ gig, Darby and Middleton convinced him to release the record. Darby later said: "I think if he had not done that trip that night there may have never been any Aphex Twin." James has given a similar account: "...they made me sign the contract when I was off my face. I was tripping and they're waving this money and a pen at me. It's a bit clichéd but it's the way they got me to sign." Similarly impressed by James' music, Wilson-Claridge suggested they use some money he inherited to create a record label to release it. He and James founded Rephlex Records in 1991.

James' first release was the 12" EP Analogue Bubblebath, released on Mighty Force in September 1991. The EP made the playlist of Kiss FM, an influential London radio station, giving it wide exposure in the dance music scene. In 2015, The Guardian called the release one of the key moments in the history of dance music. The record caught the ear of Renaat Vandepapeliere, the head of R&S Records, at that time one of the leading European rave labels. James visited him in Belgium, bringing with him a box full of cassettes of his music. From these cassettes they picked out tracks for two records, including James' first album Selected Ambient Works 85-92.

In 1992, as word of his 12" records spread, James started performing at London techno events like the formative club Knowledge, held at the SW1 nightclub in London's Victoria, and the influential night Lost.

Through 1991 and 1992, James released three Analogue Bubblebath EPs, two EPs as Caustic Window, the Red EP as part of the Universal Indicator collective, along with the Digeridoo and Xylem Tube EPs on the R&S label. Although he moved to London to take an electronics course at Kingston Polytechnic, he admitted to David Toop that his electronics studies were slipping away as he pursued a career in electronic music.

1992–1994: Selected Ambient Works and early success

The first full-length Aphex Twin album, Selected Ambient Works 85–92, comprised material dating back to James' teen years. It was released in November 1992 by Apollo Records, a subsidiary of Belgian label R&S. John Bush of Allmusic would later describe the release as a watershed moment in ambient music. In a 2002  Rolling Stone record review Pat Blashill noted that Aphex Twin had "expanded way beyond the ambient music of Brian Eno by fusing lush soundscapes with oceanic beats and bass lines," demonstrating that "techno could be more than druggy dance music". Writing for Pitchfork in 2002, David Pecoraro called it "among the most interesting music ever created with a keyboard and a computer". DJ Mag's Ben Murphy named it "a seminal record in the IDM, ambient and experimental canon".

In 1992, James also released the EPs Digeridoo and Xylem Tube EP as Aphex Twin, the Pac-Man EP (an album of remixes of Pac-Man music) as Power-Pill, two of his four Joyrex EPs (Joyrex J4 EP and Joyrex J5 EP) as Caustic Window, and Analogue Bubblebath 3. "Digeridoo" reached #55 on the UK Singles Chart, and was later described by Rolling Stone as foreshadowing drum and bass. That year, he also appeared as the Dice Man on the Warp Records compilation Artificial Intelligence with the track "Polygon Window;" the compilation would help birth the genre later known as "intelligent dance music" and help launch the career of Aphex Twin alongside Autechre and Richie Hawtin. In 1993, there followed his first releases on Warp: Surfing on Sine Waves (the second entry in the label's Artificial Intelligence series) and the EP Quoth, as Polygon Window, and later in the year the "On" EP, which entered the top 40 on the UK charts. Rephlex also put out an EP by James under the alias Bradley Strider, Bradley's Robot, and two more Caustic Window records.

James was part of several tours in 1993. He supported the Orb on several dates, and joined the "Midi Circus" tour at venues across the UK, co-headlining with Orbital, the Orb and Drum Club. Later in the year, he was part of the NASA "See the Light" tour with Orbital, Moby, and Vapourspace at venues across the United States.

Warp released the second Aphex Twin album, Selected Ambient Works Volume II, in 1994, which explored a more ambient sound, inspired by lucid dreams and James' experience of synaesthesia. It reached number 11 in the UK charts, but was not particularly well received critically; critic Simon Reynolds later noted that "many in the Aphex cult were thrown for a loop" and that "Aphex aficionados remain divided". Other 1994 releases were a fourth Analogue Bubblebath, GAK (derived from early demos sent to Warp), and Classics, a compilation album.

1995–2000: ...I Care Because You Do, Richard D. James Album and Come to Daddy

For his charting 1995 album ...I Care Because You Do, composed between 1990 and 1994 in a range of styles, James used an image of his face for the cover, which became a motif on his later releases. He commissioned Western classical-music composer Philip Glass to create an orchestral version of the ...I Care Because You Do track "Icct Hedral", which appeared on the Donkey Rhubarb EP. In the same year, James released his Hangable Auto Bulb EP under the name AFX, which spearheaded the short-lived drill 'n' bass style.

Richard D. James Album, James' fourth studio album as Aphex Twin, was released on Warp in 1996. It features software synthesisers and unconventional rhythms. Will Hermes of Spin discussed James' use of jungle elements, writing that "by applying junglist strategies to his own obsessive sound creation - his gorgeous weirdo palette of modernist strings, whirring crib toys, and agitated machines - he remakes drum'n'bass in his own image". In a Pitchfork list of the best albums of the 1990s, Eric Carr wrote that Richard D. James Album demonstrated "aggressive combinations of disparate electronic forms", with an "almost-brutal contrast between its elements" that has ensured its relevance. In 2003, NME named it the 55th greatest album of all time, and in 2009 Pitchfork named it the 40th greatest album of the 1990s.

James garnered attention the following year after the release of his charting Come to Daddy EP. The title track was conceived as a death metal parody. Accompanied with a successful music video directed by Chris Cunningham, James became disenchanted by its success: "This little idea that I had, which was a joke, turned into something huge. It wasn't right at all." It was followed by "Windowlicker", a charting single promoted with another Cunningham music video, nominated for the Brit Award for Best British Video in 2000.

2001–2009: Drukqs, Analord and the Tuss

In 2001 Aphex Twin released Drukqs, an experimental double album featuring abrasive, meticulous programming and computer-controlled piano influenced by Erik Satie and John Cage. It features the piano composition "Avril 14th", which remains perhaps James' best known work. The album polarised reviewers. James told interviewers he had accidentally left an MP3 player with new tracks on a plane, and had rushed the album release to preempt an internet leak.

In 2001, James also released a short EP, 2 Remixes By AFX, with remixes of songs by 808 State and DJ Pierre. It also had an untitled third track, consisting of a SSTV image with high-pitched sounds which can be decoded to a viewable image with appropriate software. In 2002, James was nominated for the Brit Award for Best British Male. In 2003, Warp released 26 Mixes for Cash, collecting many of James' remixes for other artists.

In 2005, James released a series of vinyl EPs under the AFX name, Analord, created entirely with analogue equipment. These were followed in 2006 by a compilation album of Analord tracks, Chosen Lords. In 2007, James released two records on Rephlex, Confederation Trough and Rushup Edge, under the alias the Tuss, Cornish slang for "erection". Media sources speculated about James' involvement, but his identity was not confirmed until 2014.

In 2009 Rephlex Records released digital versions (in the FLAC file format) of the 11 Analord EPs. Each of them (except for Analord 10) had bonus tracks, totalling 81 minutes of new music between them all. Richard later disbanded Rephlex Records, removing the website entirely.

In 2010, James said he had completed six new albums, including a new version of the unreleased Melodies from Mars. In September 2011, he performed a live tribute to the Polish composer Krzysztof Penderecki; he performed his remix of Penderecki's "Threnody to the Victims of Hiroshima" and a version of "Polymorphia". The following month, he performed at the Paris Pitchfork Music Festival.

2014–present: Caustic Window, Syro, and return as Aphex Twin

In 2014, a test pressing of a 1994 album recorded under James' pseudonym Caustic Window appeared for sale on Discogs. The album was once intended for sale on James' label Rephlex, but went unreleased. With the consent of James and Rephlex, fans organised a Kickstarter campaign to purchase the record and distribute copies.

Syro, the first album released under the Aphex Twin name since Drukqs in 2001, was released by Warp on 23 September 2014. It was marketed by a teaser campaign including graffiti, a blimp flown over London, and an announcement made via a .onion address accessible through the darknet browser Tor.

In November 2014, James released a set of 21 tracks, Modular Trax, on the audio platform SoundCloud. The tracks were later removed. Over several months in 2015, James anonymously uploaded 230 demo tracks, some dating to the 1980s, to SoundCloud. He said he had released the demos to relieve his family of the pressure to release his archives after he dies. He has continued to occasionally release tracks on the account.

On 23 January 2015, James released Computer Controlled Acoustic Instruments pt2, created with robotic instruments including the Disklavier, a computer-controlled player piano. On 8 July 2016, he released the Cheetah EP, backed by a music video for "CIRKLON3 [Колхозная mix]", the first official music video for an Aphex Twin track in 17 years. On 17 December, James performed in Houston, Texas at the Day for Night festival, his first American appearance in eight years. An untitled 12-inch vinyl was sold exclusively at the festival, containing two 10-minute tracks. On 3 June 2017, James performed at the Field Day festival and released a limited edition EP, London 03.06.17. On 19 June 2017, a Michigan record store sold an exclusive Aphex Twin record comprising two tracks released on SoundCloud in 2015. On 27 July, Aphex Twin opened an online store with expanded versions of previous albums and new tracks.

Aphex Twin released an EP, Collapse, on 14 September 2018. The EP was announced on 5 August in a garbled press release written in broken English and visually distorted with the same Aphex Twin 3D graphic found in London, Turin and Hollywood. A promotional video for the Collapse EP was to be broadcast on Adult Swim, but was cancelled after failing the Harding test. It was made available online instead, and the video for "T69 Collapse" was uploaded to YouTube.

Speculations of James' return started after a mysterious website featuring the producer’s logo inside of the word “London” was discovered by fans. Its title alluded to 19 August 2023, the same day that the Field Day festival takes place on in London, teasing a possible performance. His return was confirmed on 24 January 2023, when Aphex Twin was announced as a headliner for the festival.

Musical style and influences
Writing for AllMusic, John Bush describes James as a "pioneer of experimental techno" who has "constantly pushed the limits of what can be accomplished with electronic equipment, resulting in forward-thinking and emotionally engaging work that ranges from sublime, pastoral ambience to manic head-rush acid techno". In a 1996 review, The Independents Angela Lewis called him a "maverick of 1990s electronica [who] exemplifies the finest traditions of British pop mischief". According to Fact magazine, James has "carved out his own space in the history of electronic music" across several genres, with his unique melodies being  "the reason he's talked about as not just an electronic innovator but as the sphere's definitive artist". In 2014 review in the Financial Times, Ludovic Hunter-Tilney described James as a "musical maverick" noted for "yoking different elements together in unpredictable formulations" and blending "hard beats and uncanny tones; difficult abstraction and populist melodies". Music publications have described James variously as "the Mozart of" both techno and ambient. Writing in The Guardian in 2001, Paul Lester identified James' lineage as "electronic greats" including Karlheinz Stockhausen, John Cage, Kraftwerk, Brian Eno, and Derrick May.

James had no formal music training and is largely self-taught. Prior to becoming a producer, James spent his teens modifying analogue synthesisers and became "addicted to making noises," only later becoming "interested in listening to other people's stuff". James states that he spent his initial years "ignorant of music, apart from acid and techno, where I bought just about everything". He claimed to have been independently making music similar to acid and techno before encountering the styles, and subsequently became enthusiastic about them. He has cited 808 State's 1988 debut album Newbuild as a major early inspiration. In a 1993 interview, James identified voluntary sleep deprivation as an influence on his productions at that time. He also claimed to have recorded over one thousand unreleased tracks. He later said he experienced synaesthesia and utilised lucid dreaming as a means of developing compositional ideas. Some of James' early work was compared to Brian Eno's ambient releases, but James claimed not to have heard Eno before he began recording.

In a 1993 interview, Simon Reynolds noted that James had only recently explored avant-classical and left-field rock artists including Cage, Stockhausen, Eno, Steve Reich, Terry Riley, and Can, and had spent a couple of years "catching up" on other genres outside techno and house. In 1997, James described himself as a fan of "old tape and avant-garde music" such as Stockhausen's "Song for the Youth" and the work of American composer Tod Dockstader. He also named works by Erik Satie, Drexciya, Ween, Serge Gainsbourg, and Les Baxter among his favorite albums. When James began programming faster, jungle-inspired breakbeats in the mid-1990s, he named friends and fellow musicians Luke Vibert and Tom Jenkinson as influences. In a 2014 interview, James said of jungle that "I still think it's the ultimate genre, really, because the people making it weren't musicians," and noted that "for years, I could listen to jungle and nick things from them, but they didn't know I existed." Along with Vibert and Jenkinson, James helped to spearhead the short-lived drill 'n' bass style, which exaggerated elements of drum and bass, on his Hangable Auto Bulb EP (1995). Acknowledging another influence, James' Rephlex label released Music from the BBC Radiophonic Workshop, a compilation of music recorded by the pioneers of the BBC Radiophonic Workshop. In 2019, he described Kraftwerk as a major influence. Although he said he disliked "rock and roll", he appreciates Led Zeppelin (as a source of "great breakbeats"), and Pink Floyd (for their psychedelic music). Asked in 2011 about an artist he would like to work with, James named Kate Bush.

Rephlex Records, which James co-owned with Grant Wilson-Claridge, coined the word "braindance" to describe Aphex Twin's music. According to the label: "Braindance is the genre that encompasses the best elements of all genres, e.g. traditional, classical, electronic music, popular, modern, industrial, ambient, hip-hop, electro, house, techno, breakbeat, hardcore, ragga, garage, drum and bass, etc." According to Pitchfork's Paul Cooper braindance "escaped the mind/body binary opposition of electronic music" while retaining its club roots.

James' music has often been characterised as an example of the "intelligent dance music" that began in the 1990s. IDM is mentioned on the home page of the Intelligent Dance Music (IDM) mailing list at Hyperreal.org about the music of Aphex Twin and the Artificial Intelligence Series released by Warp Records. The series features James' recordings as Polygon Window and early productions from artists including Autechre, Black Dog, Richie Hawtin's FUSE project and Speedy J. The term spread to the United States and internet message boards. James responded to the IDM term in a 1997 interview:

Image and pseudonyms
James' face, grinning or distorted, is a theme of his album covers, music videos and songs. James said it began as a response to techno producers who concealed their identities:

The cover of ...I Care Because You Do features a self-portrait painted by James, and that of Richard D. James Album has a close-up photograph. His face is superimposed on the bodies of other people in the music videos for "Come to Daddy" and "Windowlicker". Near the end of the second track of the "Windowlicker" single (known as "Equation"), a photo of James' face is a steganogram which is revealed as a spectrogram. Another image of James and collaborator Tom Jenkinson is embedded (in SSTV format) with text in the third track of 2 Remixes by AFX, "Bonus High Frequency Sounds".

James has recorded as AFX, Blue Calx, Bradley Strider, the Universal Indicator, Caustic Window, Smojphace, GAK, PBoD (Phonic Boy on Dope), Polygon Window, Power-Pill, Q-Chastic, Dice Man, the Tuss, Soit-P.P and user18081971. In a 1997 interview, he said: "There's really no big theory. It's just things that I feel right in doing at the time and I really don't know why. I select songs for certain [names] and I just do it. I don't know what it means." In 2001, he commented on the speculation connected to many anonymous electronic artists: "A lot of people think everything electronic is mine. I get credited for so many things, it's incredible. I'm practically everyone, I reckon—everyone and nobody."

Influence and legacy
Writing in The Guardian in 2001, journalist Paul Lester described James as "the most inventive and influential figure in contemporary electronic music". Rolling Stone described James as a "hugely influential electronic musician whose ambient washes of sound and freakishly twisted beats have gone on to inform artists of all genres." AllMusic's John Bush wrote that "unlike most artists who emerged from the '90s techno scene, James established himself as a genuine personality, known for his cheeky grin and nightmare-inducing music videos as much as his groundbreaking albums and EPs," which helped to "expand his audience from ravers and critics to rock fans, with numerous non-electronic musicians citing him as an inspiration".

In 2001, Thomas Bangalter of Daft Punk cited Aphex Twin (particularly "Windowlicker") as an influence on their 2001 album Discovery. Bangalter said he liked it because "It wasn't a big club beat, but it also wasn't a laid back, quiet one". Artists including Mike Edwards of Jesus Jones, Steve Reich, Wes Borland of Limp Bizkit, Skrillex, Mike Shinoda of Linkin Park, Red Hot Chili Peppers guitarist John Frusciante, Kevin Parker of Tame Impala, and Nick Zammuto of the Books have expressed admiration for Aphex Twin or cited him as an influence.

James influenced Radiohead's transition to electronic music for their 2000 album Kid A. In 2013, Radiohead singer Thom Yorke named Aphex Twin as his biggest influence, saying: "He burns a heavy shadow ... Aphex opened up another world that didn't involve my fucking electric guitar ... I hated the Britpop thing and what was happening in America, but Aphex was totally beautiful, and he's kind of my age too." In 2002, asked if he would tour with Radiohead, James said "I wouldn't play with them since I don't like them". However, James said in 2011 that his dislike of Radiohead had been exaggerated by the press and that he had contacted Yorke by e-mail to explain this.

In 2005, Alarm Will Sound released Acoustica: Alarm Will Sound Performs Aphex Twin, featuring acoustic arrangements of James' electronic tracks. The London Sinfonietta performed arrangements of Aphex Twin songs in 2006. Animator David Firth sampled Aphex Twin in his work. In 2012, Fact named Selected Ambient Works 85–92 the best album of the 1990s.

Personal life
James has made "wild and essentially unverifiable claims" about his personal life in interviews, including the claim that he inherited the name of a dead older brother. He has described himself as "just some irritating, lying, ginger kid from Cornwall who should have been locked up in some youth detention centre. I just managed to escape and blag it into music." In a 1993 interview, he claimed to only sleep two to three hours per night. In the mid-1990s, James bought a disused bank in the Elephant & Castle area of London, where he claimed to live in a converted bank vault. He falsely claimed in a 2001 interview to have bought the steel structure in the centre of the Elephant Square roundabout, though this is in fact the Michael Faraday Memorial which houses an electricity substation for the London Underground. In the 1990s, James bought a 1950s armoured car, complete with a working machine gun, which he claimed to drive around Cornwall in lieu of a car.

In a 2010 interview with Fact, James said he is living in Scotland after relocating from London. , he lives in Scotland with his two sons from his first marriage and his second wife, Anastasia, a Russian art student. His sister Julie James is a Welsh Labour politician who was appointed the Welsh Minister for Climate Change in 2021.
In a 2014 interview, James mentioned that he finds it challenging to live in a small village: "You have to speak to everybody, and everybody knows your business. For someone like me, who’s a little bit autistic or something, it can be quite intense." He also mentioned he does not own a smartphone.

Awards
{| class=wikitable
|-
! Year !! Awards !! Category !! Work !! Result
|-
| rowspan="4"|1998
| MTV Video Music Awards
| Best Special Effects
| rowspan="4"|"Come to Daddy"
| 
|-
| rowspan=2|D&AD Awards
| Pop Promo Video with a budget over £40,000 ||style="background:#FFBF00"| Yellow Pencil
|-
| Direction
| style="background:#FFBF00"| Yellow Pencil
|-
| rowspan="2"|MTV Europe Music Awards
| rowspan=2"|Best Video
| 
|-
| rowspan="3"|1999
| "Windowlicker"
| 
|-
| Prix Ars Electronica
| Digital Music
| rowspan=2|Himself
| 
|-
| Online Music Awards
| Best Electronic Fansite
| 
|-
| rowspan="5"|2000
| Brit Awards
| Best British Video
| rowspan="4"|"Windowlicker"
| 
|-
| rowspan=2|D&AD Awards
| Direction
| style="background:#FFBF00"| Yellow Pencil
|-
| Editing
| style="background:#FFBF00"| Yellow Pencil
|-
| rowspan="3"|NME Awards
| Single of the Year
| 
|-
| rowspan=2|Best Dance Act
| rowspan="3"|Himself
| 
|-
| rowspan="3"|2002
| 
|-
| Brit Awards
| British Male Solo Artist
| 
|-
| Shortlist Music Prize
| Album of the Year
| Drukqs
| 
|-
| 2005
| Antville Music Video Awards
| Best Video
| "Rubber Johnny"
| 
|-
| rowspan=3|2014
| rowspan=3|Rober Awards Music Poll
| Best Male Artist
| rowspan=3|Himself
| 
|-
| Comeback of the Year
| 
|-
| Best Electronica
| 
|-
| rowspan="7"|2015
| Grammy Awards
| Best Dance/Electronica Album
| rowspan="6"|Syro
|
|-
| International Dance Music Awards
| Best Full Length Studio Recording
| 
|-
| IMPALA Awards
| Album of the Year
| 
|-
| Mercury Prize
| rowspan="2"|Album of the Year
| 
|-
| rowspan="3"|A2IM Libera Awards
| 
|-
| Creative Packaging Award
| 
|-
| Marketing Genius
| Syro album release campaign
| 
|-
| 2016
| Brit Awards
| British Male Solo Artist
| Himself
| 
|-
| rowspan="5"|2018
| Rober Awards Music Poll
| Best EP
| rowspan=2|Collapse
| 
|-
|Best Art Vinyl
| Best Art Vinyl
| 
|-
| rowspan="3"|UK Video Music Awards
| Best Dance Video
| rowspan="4"|"T69 Collapse"
| 
|-
| Best Visual Effects in a Video
| 
|-
| Best Animation in a Video
| 
|-
| rowspan=4|2019
| Classic Pop Reader Awards
| Video of the Year
| 
|-
| Brit Awards
| British Male Solo Artist
| Himself
| 
|-
| rowspan=2|A2IM Libera Awards
| Marketing Genius
| Collapse
| 
|-
| Video of the Year
|"T69 Collapse"
|

Discography

Studio albums as Aphex Twin
 Selected Ambient Works 85–92 (1992)
 Selected Ambient Works Volume II (1994)
 ...I Care Because You Do (1995)
 Richard D. James Album (1996)
 Drukqs (2001)
 Syro (2014)

See also

 List of ambient music artists

Notes

References

External links

 Aphex Twin at Warp Records
 
 
 SoundCloud page: Aphex Twin

 
1971 births
Living people
Ambient musicians
Braindance musicians
British electronic musicians
British techno musicians
Intelligent dance musicians
British experimental musicians
English record producers
People from Lanner, Cornwall
Rhythm King artists
Sire Records artists
Warp (record label) artists
Tracker musicians
TVT Records artists
People educated at Cornwall College
Grammy Award winners for dance and electronic music
Alumni of Kingston University
Irish emigrants to the United Kingdom
Musicians from Cornwall
Irish people of Welsh descent